Intuit is an American software company.

Intuit may also refer to:

Intuit (Ramona Falls album)
Intuit (Kurt Rosenwinkel album)
Intuit, a limited edition collection of science fiction short stories by Hal Clement
Intuit: The Center for Intuitive and Outsider Art, a Chicago-based art museum

See also
Intuition (disambiguation)